Panta Džambazoski (born 9 October 1960) is a musician and journalist from the Republic of Macedonia. He was first drummer of the Macedonian rock band Mizar, of which he chose the name. He was in the band for seven years. For a short while after that he was in the band Berlin Gori. In 1988 he joined Arhangel. He is now a journalist for the television station TV Telma.

Biography 
At the end of 1988, Panta Dzambazovski was the first drummer in the group Arhangel, founded by Risto Vrtev. Today, Panta Dzambazovski is a news editor at TV Telma, one of the most watched private televisions with a national license in Macedonia. Prior to that, he was an editor at the once largest Macedonian daily Nova Makedonija, and opened a correspondence office in Tirana., from where he reported for two years. He began his journalistic career in 1985. in the youth newspaper Mlad Borec, where he was first music editor, and then editor of the political section

See also
Arhangel
Anastasia
Padot na Vizantija
Goran Trajkoski
Music of the Republic of Macedonia
SFR Yugoslav pop and rock scene

References

 Panta Dzambazovski Biography (Written in Croatian)

External links
Official site of the band Mizar
Official site of the TV Station Telma

Living people
1960 births
Macedonian musicians